Franc Škerlj (born 6 May 1941) is a former Yugoslav cyclist. He competed in the team time trial at the 1968 Summer Olympics.

References

External links
 

1941 births
Living people
Yugoslav male cyclists
Olympic cyclists of Yugoslavia
Cyclists at the 1968 Summer Olympics
Sportspeople from Ljubljana
Slovenian male cyclists